Stephen K. White (born 1949), is James Hart Professor of Politics at the University of Virginia.  His research focuses on critical social and political theory, philosophy of social science, and continental political thought.  He has contributed to several scholarly works on Jürgen Habermas, including The Cambridge Companion to Habermas, which he edited.  He is also a past editor of the journal Political Theory.

Recently, White's research has focused upon the concept of weak ontology, which he uses to describe a non-foundationalist approach to normative affirmation extrapolated from the works of George Kateb, Charles Taylor, Judith Butler, and William E. Connolly.

Education 
White received his Ph.D. from the City University of New York in 1980.

Selected bibliography

Books

Edited books

Journal articles

References

External links 
White's University of Virginia Faculty Page

1949 births
Living people
University of Virginia faculty
Graduate Center, CUNY alumni
Continental philosophers
American political philosophers
20th-century American philosophers
Critical theorists
Ontologists
Philosophers of social science
Philosophers from Virginia